Zianon Stanislavavič Pazniak (born 24 April 1944) is a Belarusian nationalist politician, one of the founders of the Belarusian Popular Front and leader of the Conservative Christian Party – BPF. He was the Belarusian Popular Front nominee for President of Belarus in the 1994 election.

Zianon Pazniak has lived in the United States since 1996.

Biography 

Zianon Pazniak was born in the village of Subotniki in Baranavichy Voblast (present-day Hrodna Region).

He graduated from the Belarusian State Institute of Theatre and Arts in 1967 and completed his postgraduate studies at the Institute of Ethnography, Art and Folklore in 1972. Upon completion of his university studies, Pazniak worked as an arts researcher. After a wave of Soviet political-administrative repressions in 1974 resulting in the loss of his work at the Arts Institute, Pazniak worked as an archaeologist at the Archaeological Division of the History Institute of the Belarusian Science Academy. His specialisation was the Late Middle Ages in Belarus. He was heavily involved in efforts to preserve the remaining section of the historic centre of Minsk, which was considerably damaged by the redevelopment efforts undertaken by the Soviet administration after the end of the Second World War. In 1981 Pazniak successfully defended a doctoral dissertation on the history of the theatre.

In 1988, Zianon Pazniak made public his researches of NKVD mass executions in the forest of Kurapaty near Minsk. At that time, he became a leader of the Belarusian national movement for freedom and independence. In 1988, along with Vasil Bykaŭ, he was one of the founders of the Belarusian Popular Front and the Belarusian Martyrologue.

From May 1990 until January 1996, Pazniak was a deputy of the Belarusian parliament. As parliamentary deputy, he was the leader of the fraction of the BPF.

In 1994, he participated in the 1994 election as the Belarusian Popular Front nominee, gaining 13.1 percent of the vote. Pazniak’s candidacy was supported by the famous Belarusian writer Vasil Bykaŭ and a number of representatives of the Belarusian scientific community.

In 1996, Zianon Pazniak fled Belarus, citing a potential arrest by the forces of the Belarusian president Aliaksandar Lukashenka. He was granted political asylum in the United States.

On June 19, 1997, Belarus's prosecutor's office opened a criminal case against Pazniak accusing him of incitement to ethnic hatred against Russian people.

Following emigration, Zianon Pazniak is still active in leading the CCP-BPF (Christian Conservative Party of the BPF). His endeavour to participate in the presidential elections of 2006 was set back when he refused to forward the requisite number of signatures gathered for his candidacy. Pazniak and the Conservative Christian Party – BPF refused to join elections in the oppositional coalition led by Aliaksandar Milinkevich in 2006 election.

He is a founding signatory of the Prague Declaration on European Conscience and Communism. In 2018, Pazniak received the Belarusian Democratic Republic 100th Jubilee Medal from the Rada of the Belarusian Democratic Republic in Exile.

Family 

Zianon Pazniak's grandfather was Jan Pazniak (1887 (1895 ?) – 1939 ?), a Belarusian publisher, editor, publicist and politician. Jan Pazniak took part in the activity of the Belarusian Christian educational movement and was a member of the Christian Democratic Union since its founding in May 1917 in Petrograd. Jan Pazniak published several newspapers and magazines as “Biełarus”, “Biełaruskaja krynica” (English: Belarusian Spring), “Chryścijanskaja Dumka” (English: Christian Thought) and “Ranica” (English: Morning). In September–October 1939, he was arrested by the NKVD and taken out of Vilna. According to one version, Jan Pazniak was held in prison in Staraja Vilejka not far from Maladziechna until June 1941. The circumstances and date of his death are still unknown.

His father was Stanisłaŭ Janavič Pazniak (1922-1944). Stanisłaŭ Pazniak was recruited into the Red Army in the summer of 1944 and died on the Soviet-German front in December 1944.

His mother was Hanna Jaŭchimaŭna Pazniak (1922-2012). She lived in Subotniki almost all her life. In her last years, she was seriously ill. When she died in April 2012, Pazniak didn't come to the funeral, fearing persecution by the authorities.

His wife is Halina Pazniak (Vaščanka). She was a deputy of the Minsk City Council. They have been married since 1995. She lives in Warsaw.

His step daughter is Nadzieja.

Criticism 

Stanislau Shushkevich thought that neither the West nor Belarus needed Pazniak. Shushkevich said that Pazniak is a political deserter, who cowardly ran away from Belarus. Pavel Sharamet thought that Pazniak was an intolerant and rough politician and his emigration was cowardice. Alaksiej Janukievich called Pazniak's accusations of collaboration with KGB "paranoia". Roy Medvedev thinks that Pazniak is a radical nationalist. Valeriya Novodvorskaya said that Pazniak "died" the day when he was frightened for his "precious" life and emigrated.

See also 

 Belarusian nationalism
 Stanislau Shushkevich

References

External links 

Bielarus.net: Bielaruskaja Salidarnasc
Official Zianon Pazniak website – Pazniak.info
Christian Conservative Party of the BPF
"Народная перамога"(People's victory)

1944 births
Living people
People from Iwye District
Belarusian dissidents
Belarusian expatriates in the United States
Soviet dissidents
BPF Party politicians
Conservative Christian Party – BPF politicians
Members of the Supreme Council of Belarus
Candidates for President of Belarus
Belarusian Roman Catholics
Anti-Russification activists
Belarusian State Academy of Arts alumni